Chandrugonda is a village in Chandrugonda mandal in Bhadradri Kothagudem district of Telangana, India.

Demographics
According to the 2011 Indian census, the demographic details of Chandrugonda village are:- 
 Total population: 6,822 in 1,803 households
 Male population: 3,382 and female population: 3,440 giving a ratio of 1017
 Children under 6-years of age: 655 = 9.6% of the population
 Literacy rate = 62.56% - below the state average of 67.02%

References

Villages in Bhadradri Kothagudem district